Calycina is a genus of beetles in the family Mordellidae, containing the following species:

 Calycina borneensis (Blair, 1922)
 Calycina gardneri Blair, 1931
 Calycina guineensis (Blair, 1922)
 Calycina horaki Ruzzier & Kovalev, 2016
 Calycina impressa (Pic, 1931)
 Calycina major Nomura, 1967
 Calycina nigriceps (Blair, 1922)
 Calycina nigroapicalis Nomura, 1967
 Calycina palpalis (Blair, 1922)
 Calycina poggii Ruzzier, 2013
 Calycina sericeobrunnea (Blair, 1915)
 Calycina sudanensis Ermisch, 1968
 Calycina tarsalis (Blair, 1922)

References

Mordellidae